ALICE (A Large Ion Collider Experiment) is one of eight detector experiments at the Large Hadron Collider at CERN. The other seven are: ATLAS, CMS, TOTEM, LHCb, LHCf, MoEDAL and FASER.

Introduction

ALICE is optimized to study heavy-ion (Pb-Pb nuclei) collisions at a centre of mass energy up to 5.02 TeV per nucleon pair. The resulting temperature and energy density allow exploration of quark–gluon plasma, a fifth state of matter wherein quarks and gluons are freed. Similar conditions are believed to have existed a fraction of the second after the Big Bang before quarks and gluons bound together to form hadrons and heavier particles.

ALICE is focusing on the physics of strongly interacting matter at extreme energy densities. The properties of the quark–gluon plasma and the understanding of quark deconfinement are key issues in quantum chromodynamics (QCD). The results obtained by ALICE corroborate the understanding of color confinement and chiral symmetry restoration. Recreating the primordial form of matter, quark-gluon plasma, and understanding how it evolves is expected to shed light on questions about how matter is organized, the mechanism that confines quarks and gluons and the nature of strong interactions and how they result in generating the bulk of the mass of ordinary matter.

Quantum chromodynamics (QCD) predicts that at sufficiently high energy densities there will be a phase transition from conventional hadronic matter, where quarks are locked inside nuclear particles, to a plasma of deconfined quarks and gluons. The reverse of this transition is believed to have taken place when the universe was just 10−6 s old, and may still play a role today in the hearts of collapsing neutron stars or other astrophysical objects.

History
The idea of building a dedicated heavy-ion detector for the LHC was first aired at the historic Evian meeting "Towards the LHC experimental Programme" in March 1992. From the ideas presented there, the ALICE collaboration was formed and in 1993, a Letter of Interest was submitted.

ALICE was first proposed as a central detector in 1993 and later complemented by an additional forward muon spectrometer designed in 1995. In 1997, ALICE received the green light from the LHC Committee to proceed towards final design and construction.

The first ten years were spent on design and an extensive R&D effort. Like for all other LHC experiments, it became clear from the outset that also the challenges of heavy ion physics at LHC could not be really met (nor paid for) with existing technology. Significant advances, and in some cases a technological break-through, would be required to build on the ground what physicists had dreamed up on paper for their experiments. The initially very broad and later more focused, well organised and well supported R&D effort, which was sustained over most of the 1990s, has led to many evolutionary and some revolutionary advances in detectors, electronics and computing.

Designing a dedicated heavy-ion experiment in the early '90s for use at the LHC some 15 years later posed some daunting challenges. The detector had to be general purpose - able to measure most signals of potential interest, even if their relevance may only become apparent later - and flexible, allowing additions and modifications along the way as new avenues of investigation would open up. In both respects ALICE did quite well, as it included a number of observables in its initial menu whose importance only became clear later. Various major detection system were added, from the muon spectrometer in 1995, the transition radiation detectors in 1999 to a large jet calorimeter added in 2007.

ALICE recorded data from the first lead-lead collisions at the LHC in 2010. Data sets taken during heavy-ion periods in 2010 and 2011 as well as proton-lead data from 2013 have provided an excellent basis for an in-depth look at the physics of quark–gluon plasma.

 After more than three years of successful operation, the ALICE detector is about to undergo a major programme of consolidation and upgrade during the long shutdown [LS1] of CERN's accelerator complex. A new subdetector called the dijet calorimeter (DCAL) will be installed, and all 18 of the existing ALICE subdetectors will be upgraded. There will also be major renovation work on the ALICE infrastructure, including the electrical and cooling systems. The wealth of published scientific results and the very intense upgrade programme of ALICE have attracted numerous institutes and scientists from all over the world. Today the ALICE Collaboration has more than 1800 members coming from 176 institutes in 41 countries

Heavy-ion collisions at the LHC
Searches for Quark Gluon plasma and a deeper understanding of the QCD started at CERN and Brookhaven with lighter ions in the 1980s. Today's programme at these laboratories has moved on to ultrarelativistic collisions of heavy ions, and is just reaching the energy threshold at which the phase transition is expected to occur. The LHC, with a centre-of-mass energy around 5.5 TeV/nucleon, will push the energy reach even further.

During head-on collisions of lead ions at the LHC, hundreds of protons and neutrons smash into one another at energies of upwards of a few TeVs. Lead ions are accelerated to more than 99.9999% of the speed of light and collisions at the LHC are 100 times more energetic than those of protons - heating up matter in the interaction point to a temperature almost 100,000 times higher than the temperature in the core of the sun.

When the two lead nuclei slam into each other, matter undergoes a transition to form for a brief instant a droplet of primordial matter, the so-called quark–gluon plasma which is believed to have filled the universe a few microseconds after the Big Bang.

The quark–gluon plasma is formed as protons and neutrons "melt" into their elementary constituents, quarks and gluons become asymptotically free. The droplet of QGP instantly cools, and the individual quarks and gluons (collectively called partons) recombine into a blizzard of ordinary matter that speeds away in all directions. The debris contains particles such as pions and kaons, which are made of a quark and an antiquark; protons and neutrons, made of three quarks; and even copious antiprotons and antineutrons, which may combine to form the nuclei of antiatoms as heavy as helium. Much can be learned by studying the distribution and energy of this debris.

First lead-lead collisions

The Large Hadron Collider smashed its first lead ions in 2010, on 7 November at around 12:30 a.m. CET.

The first collisions in the center of the ALICE, ATLAS and CMS detectors took place less than 72 hours after the LHC ended its first run of protons and switched to accelerating lead-ion beams. Each lead nucleus contains 82 protons, and the LHC accelerates each proton to an energy of 3.5 TeV, thus resulting in an energy of 287 TeV per beam, or a total collision energy of 574 TeV.

Up to 3,000 charged particles were emitted from each collision, shown here as lines radiating from the collision point. The colors of the lines indicate how much energy each particle carried away from the collision.

Proton-lead collisions at the LHC

In 2013, the LHC collided protons with lead ions for the LHC's first physics beams of 2013. The experiment was conducted by counter-rotating beams of protons and lead ions, and begun with centred orbits with different revolution frequencies, and then separately ramped to the accelerator's maximum collision energy.

The first lead-proton run at the LHC lasted for one month and data help ALICE physicists to decouple the effects of the plasma from effects that stem from cold nuclear matter effects and shed more light on the study of the Quark-Gluon plasma.

In the case of lead-lead collisions, the configurations of the quarks and gluons that make up the protons and neutrons of the incoming lead nucleus can be somewhat different of those in the incoming protons. In order to study if part of the effects we see when comparing lead-lead and proton-proton collisions is due to this configuration difference rather than the formation of the plasma. Proton-lead collisions are an ideal tool for this study.

The ALICE detectors
A key design consideration of ALICE is the ability to study QCD and quark (de)confinement under these extreme conditions. This is done by using particles, created inside the hot volume as it expands and cools down, that live long enough to reach the sensitive detector layers situated around the interaction region. ALICE's physics programme relies on being able to identify all of them, i.e. to determine if they are electrons, photons, pions, etc. and to determine their charge. This involves making the most of the (sometimes slightly) different ways that particles interact with matter.

In a "traditional" experiment, particles are identified or at least assigned to families (charged or neutral hadrons), by the characteristic signatures they leave in the detector. The experiment is divided into a few main components and each component tests a specific set of particle properties. These components are stacked in layers and the particles go through the layers sequentially from the collision point outwards: first a tracking system, then an electromagnetic (EM) and a hadronic calorimeter and finally a muon system. The detectors are embedded in a magnetic field in order to bend the tracks of charged particles for momentum and charge determination. This method for particle identification works well only for certain particles, and is used for example by the large LHC experiments ATLAS and CMS. However, this technique is not suitable for hadron identification as it doesn't allow distinguishing the different charged hadrons that are produced in Pb-Pb collisions.

In order to identify all the particles that are coming out of the system of the QGP ALICE is using a set of 18 detectors that give information about the mass, the velocity and the electrical sign of the particles.

Barrel tracking
An ensemble of cylindrical barrel detectors that surround the nominal interaction point is used to track all the particles that fly out of the hot, dense medium. The Inner Tracking System(ITS) (consisting of three layers of detectors: Silicon Pixel Detector(SPD), Silicon Drift Detector(SDD), Silicon Strip Detector(SSD)), the Time Projection Chamber(TPC) and the Transition Radiation Detector(TRD) measure at many points the passage of each particle carrying an electric charge and give precise information about the particle's trajectory. The ALICE barrel tracking detectors are embedded in a magnetic field of 0.5 Tesla produced by a huge magnetic solenoid bending the trajectories of the particles. From the curvature of the tracks one can derive their momentum. The ITS is so precise that particles which are generated by the decay of other particles with a long(~.1 mm before decay) life time can be identified by seeing that they do not originate from the point where the interaction has taken place (the "vertex" of the event) but rather from a point at a distance of as small as a tenth of a millimeter. This allows us to measure, for example, bottom quarks which decay into a relatively long-lived B-meson through "topological" cuts.

Inner Tracking System

The short-living heavy particles cover a very small distance before decaying. This system aims at identifying these phenomena of decay by measuring the location where it occurs with a precision of a tenth of millimetre.

The Inner Tracking System (ITS) consists of six cylindrical layers of silicon detectors. The layers surround the collision point and measure the properties of the particles emerging from the collisions, pin-pointing their position of passage to a fraction of a millimetre. With the help of the ITS, particles containing heavy quarks (charm and beauty) can be identified by reconstructing the coordinates at which they decay.

ITS layers (counting from the interaction point):
2 layers of SPD (Silicon Pixel Detector),
2 layers of SDD (Silicon Drift Detector),
2 layers of SSD (Silicon Strip Detector).

The ITS was inserted at the heart of the ALICE experiment in March 2007 following a large phase of R&D. Using the smallest amounts of the lightest material, the ITS has been made as lightweight and delicate as possible. With almost 5 m2 of double-sided silicon strip detectors and more than 1 m2 of silicon drift detectors, it is the largest system using both types of silicon detector.

ALICE has recently presented plans for an upgraded Inner Tracking System, mainly based on building a new silicon tracker with greatly improved features in terms of determination of the impact parameter (d0) to the primary vertex, tracking efficiency at low pT and readout rate capabilities. The upgraded ITS will open new channels in the study of the Quark Gluon Plasma formed at LHC which are necessary in order to understand the dynamics of this condensed phase of the QCD.

It will allow the study of the process of thermalization of heavy quarks in the medium by measuring heavy flavour charmed and beauty baryons and extending these measurements down to very low pT for the first time. It will also give a better understanding of the quark mass dependence of in-medium energy loss and offer a unique capability of measuring the beauty quarks while also improving the beauty decay vertex reconstruction. Finally, the upgraded ITS will give us the chance to characterize the thermal radiation coming from the QGP and the in-medium modification of hadronic spectral functions as related to chiral symmetry restoration.

The upgrade project requires an extensive R&D effort by our researchers and collaborators all over the world on cutting-edge technologies: silicon sensors, low-power electronics, interconnection and packaging technologies, ultra-light mechanical structures and cooling units.

Time Projection Chamber

The ALICE Time Projection Chamber (TPC)  is a large volume filled with a gas as detection medium and is the main particle tracking device in ALICE.

Charged particles crossing the gas of the TPC ionize the gas atoms along their path, liberating electrons that drift towards the end plates of the detector. The characteristics of the ionization process caused by fast charged particles passing through a medium can be used for particle identification. The velocity dependence of the ionization strength is connected to the well-known Bethe-Bloch formula, which describes the average energy loss of charged particles through inelastic Coulomb collisions with the atomic electrons of the medium.

Multiwire proportional counters or solid-state counters are often used as detection medium, because they provide signals with pulse heights proportional to the ionization strength. An avalanche effect in the vicinity of the anode wires strung in the readout chambers, gives the necessary signal amplification. The positive ions created in the avalanche induce a positive current signal on the pad plane. The readout is performed by the 557 568 pads that form the cathode plane of the multi-wire proportional chambers (MWPC) located at the end plates. This gives the radial distance to the beam and the azimuth. The last coordinate, z along the beam direction, is given by the drift time. Since energy-loss fluctuations can be considerable, in general many pulse-height measurements are performed along the particle track in order to optimize the resolution of the ionization measurement.

Almost all of the TPC's volume is sensitive to the traversing charged particles, but it features a minimum material budget. The straightforward pattern recognition (continuous tracks) make TPCs the perfect choice for high-multiplicity environments, such as in heavy-ion collisions, where thousands of particles have to be tracked simultaneously. Inside the ALICE TPC, the ionization strength of all tracks is sampled up to 159 times, resulting in a resolution of the ionization measurement as good as 5%.

Transition radiation detector

Electrons and positrons can be discriminated from other charged particles using the emission of transition radiation, X-rays emitted when the particles cross many layers of thin materials.

The identification of electrons and positrons is achieved using a transition radiation detector (TRD). In a similar manner to the muon spectrometer, this system enables detailed studies of the production of vector-meson resonances, but with extended coverage down to the light vector-meson ρ and in a different rapidity region. Below 1 GeV/c, electrons can be identified via a combination of particle identification detector (PID) measurements in the TPC and time of flight (TOF). In the momentum range 1–10 GeV/c, the fact that electrons may create TR when travelling through a dedicated "radiator" can be exploited. Inside such a radiator, fast charged particles cross the boundaries between materials with different dielectric constants, which can lead to the emission of TR photons with energies in the X-ray range. The effect is tiny and the radiator has to provide many hundreds of material boundaries to achieve a high enough probability to produce at least one photon. In the ALICE TRD, the TR photons are detected just behind the radiator using MWPCs filled with a xenon-based gas mixture, where they deposit their energy on top of the ionization signals from the particle's track.

The ALICE TRD was designed to derive a fast trigger for charged particles with high momentum and can significantly enhance the recorded yields of vector mesons. For this purpose, 250,000 CPUs are installed right on the detector to identify candidates for high-momentum tracks and analyse the energy deposition associated with them as quickly as possible (while the signals are still being created in the detector). This information is sent to a global tracking unit, which combines all of the information to search for electron–positron track pairs within only 6 μs.

To develop such a Transition Radiation Detector (TRD) for ALICE many detector prototypes were tested in mixed beams of pions and electrons.

Particle identification with ALICE
ALICE also wants to know the identity of each particle, whether it is an electron, or a proton, a kaon or a pion.

Charged hadrons (in fact, all stable charged particles) are unambiguously identified if their mass and charge are determined. The mass can be deduced from measurements of the momentum and of the velocity. Momentum and the sign of the charge are obtained by measuring the curvature of the particle's track in a magnetic field. To obtain the particle velocity there exist four methods based on measurements of time-of-flight and ionization, and on detection of transition radiation and Cherenkov radiation. Each of these methods works well in different momentum ranges or for specific types of particle. In ALICE all of these methods may be combined in order to measure, for instance, particle spectra.

In addition to the information given by ITS and TPC, more specialized detectors are needed: the TOF measures, with a precision better than a tenth of a billionth of a second, the time that each particle takes to travel from the vertex to reach it, so that one can measure its speed. The high momentum particle identification detector (HMPID) measures the faint light patterns generated by fast particles and the TRD measures the special radiation very fast particles emit when crossing different materials, thus allowing to identify electrons. Muons are measured by exploiting the fact that they penetrate matter more easily than most other particles: in the forward region a very thick and complex absorber stops all other particles and muons are measured by a dedicated set of detectors: the muon spectrometer.

Time of Flight
Charged particles are identified in ALICE by Time-Of-Flight (TOF). TOF measurements yield the velocity of a charged particle by measuring the flight time over a given distance along the track trajectory. Using the tracking information from other detectors every track firing a sensor is identified. Provided the momentum is also known, the mass of the particle can then be derived from these measurements. There are approximately 160 000 MRPC pads with time resolution of about 100 ps distributed over the large surface of 150 m2.

The MRPCs are parallel-plate detectors built of thin sheets of standard window glass to create narrow gas gaps with high electric fields. These plates are separated using fishing lines to provide the desired spacing; 10 gas gaps per MRPC are needed to arrive at a detection efficiency close to 100%.

The simplicity of the construction allows a large system to be built with an overall TOF resolution of 80 ps at a relatively low cost (CERN Courier November 2011 p8). This performance allows the separation of kaons, pions and protons up to momenta of a few GeV/c. Combining such a measurement with the PID information from the ALICE TPC has proved useful in improving the separation between the different particle types, as figure 3 shows for a particular momentum range.

High Momentum Particle Identification Detector

The High Momentum Particle Identification Detector (HMPID) is a RICH detector to determine the speed of particles beyond the momentum range available through energy loss (in ITS and TPC, p = 600 MeV) and through time-of-flight measurements (in TOF, p = 1.2–1.4 GeV).

Cherenkov radiation is a shock wave resulting from charged particles moving through a material faster than the velocity of light in that material. The radiation propagates with a characteristic angle with respect to the particle track, which depends on the particle velocity. Cherenkov detectors make use of this effect and in general consist of two main elements: a radiator in which Cherenkov radiation is produced and a photon detector. Ring imaging Cherenkov (RICH) detectors resolve the ring-shaped image of the focused Cherenkov radiation, enabling a measurement of the Cherenkov angle and thus the particle velocity. This in turn is sufficient to determine the mass of the charged particle.

If a dense medium (large refractive index) is used, only a thin radiator layer of the order of a few centimetres is required to emit a sufficient number of Cherenkov photons. The photon detector is then located at some distance (usually about 10 cm) behind the radiator, allowing the cone of light to expand and form the characteristic ring-shaped image. Such a proximity-focusing RICH is installed in the ALICE experiment.

ALICE HMPID's momentum range is up to 3 GeV for pion/kaon discrimination and up to 5 GeV for kaon/proton discrimination.  It is the world's largest caesium iodide RICH detector, with an active area of 11 m2. A prototype was successfully tested at CERN in 1997 and currently takes data at the Relativistic Heavy Ion Collider at the Brookhaven National Laboratory in the US.

Calorimeters
Calorimeters measure the energy of particles, and determine whether they have electromagnetic or hadronic interactions. Particle Identification in a calorimeter is a destructive measurement. All particles except muons and neutrinos deposit all their energy in the calorimeter system by production of electromagnetic or hadronic showers. Photons, electrons and positrons deposit all their energy in an electromagnetic calorimeter. Their showers are indistinguishable, but a photon can be identified by the non-existence of a track in the tracking system that is associated to the shower.

The photons (particles of light), like the light emitted from a hot object, tell us about the temperature of the system. To measure them, special detectors are necessary: the crystals of the PHOS, which are as dense as lead and as transparent as glass, will measure them with fantastic precision in a limited region, while the PMD and in particular the EMCal will measure them over a very wide area. The EMCal will also measure groups of close particles (called "jets") which have a memory of the early phases of the event.

Photon spectrometer

PHOS is a high-resolution electromagnetic calorimeter installed in ALICE to provide data to test the thermal and dynamical properties of the initial phase of the collision. This is done by measuring photons emerging directly from the collision. PHOS covers a limited acceptance domain at central rapidity. It is made of lead tungstate crystals, similar to the ones used by CMS, read out using Avalanche Photodiodes (APD).

When high energy photons strike lead tungstate, they make it glow, or scintillate, and this glow can be measured. Lead tungstate is extremely dense (denser than iron), stopping most photons that reach it. The crystals are kept at a temperature of 248 K, which helps to minimize the deterioration of the energy resolution due to noise and to optimize the response for low energies.

Electro-Magnetic Calorimeter
The EMCal is a lead-scintillator sampling calorimeter comprising almost 13,000 individual towers that are grouped into ten super-modules. The towers are read out by wavelength-shifting optical fibers in a shashlik geometry coupled to an avalanche photodiode. The complete EMCal will contain 100,000 individual scintillator tiles and 185 kilometers of optical fiber, weighing in total about 100 tons.

The EMCal covers almost the full length of the ALICE Time Projection Chamber and central detector, and a third of its azimuth placed back-to-back with the ALICE Photon Spectrometer – a smaller, highly granular lead-tungstate calorimeter.

The super-modules are inserted into an independent support frame situated within the ALICE magnet, between the time-of-flight counters and the magnet coil. The support frame itself is a complex structure: it weighs 20 tons and must support five times its own weight, with a maximum deflection between being empty and being fully loaded of only a couple of centimeters. Installation of the eight-ton super-modules requires a system of rails with a sophisticated insertion device to bridge across to the support structure.

The Electro-Magnetic Calorimeter (EM-Cal) will add greatly to the high momentum particle measurement capabilities of ALICE. It will extend ALICE's reach to study jets and other hard processes.

Photon Multiplicity Detector
The Photon Multiplicity Detector (PMD) is a Particle shower detector which measures the multiplicity and spatial distribution of photons produced in the collisions. It utilizes as a first layer a veto detector to reject charged particles. Photons on the other hand pass through a converter, initiating an electromagnetic shower in a second detector layer where they produce large signals on several cells of its sensitive volume. Hadrons on the other hand normally affect only one cell and produce a signal representing minimum-ionizing particles.

Forward Multiplicity Detector

The Forward Multiplicity Detector (FMD) extends the coverage for multiplicity of charge particles into the forward regions - giving ALICE the widest coverage of the 4 LHC experiments for these measurements.

The FMD consist of 5 large silicon discs with each 10 240 individual detector channels to measure the charged particles emitted at small angles relative to the beam. FMD provides an independent measurement of the orientation of the collisions in the vertical plane, which can be used with measurements from the barrel detector to investigate flow, jets, etc.

Muon spectrometer
The ALICE forward muon spectrometer studies the complete spectrum of heavy quarkonia (J/Ψ, Ψ′, ϒ, ϒ′, ϒ′′) via their decay in the μ+μ– channel. Heavy quarkonium states, provide an essential tool to study the early and hot stage of heavy-ion collisions. In particular they are expected to be sensitive to Quark-Gluon Plasma formation. In the presence of a deconfined medium (i.e. QGP) with high enough energy density, quarkonium states are dissociated because of colour screening. This leads to a suppression of their production rates. At the high LHC collision energy, both the charmonium states (J/Ψ and Ψ′) as well as the bottomonium states (ϒ, ϒ′ and ϒ′′) can be studied. The Dimuon spectrometer is optimized for the detection of these heavy quark resonances.

Muons may be identified using the just described technique by using the fact that they are the only charged particles able to pass almost undisturbed through any material. This behaviour is connected to the fact that muons with momenta below a few hundred GeV/c do not suffer from radiative energy losses and so do not produce electromagnetic showers. Also, because they are leptons, they are not subject to strong interactions with the nuclei of the material they traverse. This behaviour is exploited in muon spectrometers in high-energy physics experiments by installing muon detectors behind the calorimeter systems or behind thick absorber materials. All charged particles other than muons are completely stopped, producing electromagnetic (and hadronic) showers.

The muon spectrometer in the forward region of ALICE features a very thick and complex front absorber and an additional muon filter consisting of an iron wall 1.2 m thick. Muon candidates selected from tracks penetrating these absorbers are measured precisely in a dedicated set of tracking detectors. Pairs of muons are used to collect the spectrum of heavy-quark vector-meson resonances (J/Psi). Their production rates can be analysed as a function of transverse momentum and collision centrality in order to investigate dissociation due to colour screening. The acceptance of the ALICE Muon Spectrometer covers the pseudorapidity interval 2.5 ≤ η ≤ 4 and the resonances can be detected down to zero transverse momentum.

Characterization of the collision
Finally, we need to know how powerful the collision was: this is done by measuring the remnants of the colliding nuclei in detectors made of high density materials located about 110 meters on both sides of ALICE (the ZDCs) and by measuring with the FMD, V0 and T0 the number of particles produced in the collision and their spatial distribution. T0 also measures with high precision the time when the event takes place.

Zero Degree Calorimeter

The ZDCs are calorimeters which detect the energy of the spectator nucleons in order to determine the overlap region of the two colliding nuclei. It is composed of four calorimeters, two to detect protons (ZP) and two to detect neutrons (ZN). They are located 115 meters away from the interaction point on both sides, exactly along the beam line. The ZN is placed at zero degree with respect to the LHC beam axis, between the two beam pipes. That is why we call them Zero Degree Calorimeters (ZDC).The ZP is positioned externally to the outgoing beam pipe. The spectator protons are separated from the ion beams by means of the dipole magnet D1.

The ZDCs are "spaghetti calorimeters", made by a stack of heavy metal plates grooved to allocate a matrix of quartz fibres. Their principle of operation is based on the detection of Cherenkov light produced by the charged particles of the shower in the fibers.

V0 detector
V0 is made of two arrays of scintillator counters set on both sides of the ALICE interaction point, and called V0-A and V0-C. The V0-C counter is located upstream of the dimuon arm absorber and cover the spectrometer acceptance while the V0-A counter will be located at around 3.5 m away from the collision vertex, on the other side.

It is used to estimate the centrality of the collision by summing up the energy deposited in the two disks of V0. This observable scales directly with the number of primary particles generated in the collision and therefore to the centrality.

V0 is also used as reference in Van Der Meer scans that give the size and shape of colliding beams and therefore the luminosity delivered to the experiment.

T0 detector

ALICE T0 serves as a start, trigger and luminosity detector for ALICE. The accurate interaction time (START) serves as the reference signal for the Time-of-Flight detector that is used for particle identification. T0 supplies five different trigger signals to the Central Trigger Processor. The most important of these is the T0 vertex providing prompt and accurate confirmation of the location of the primary interaction point along the beam axis within the set boundaries. The detector is also used for online luminosity monitoring providing fast feedback to the accelerator team.

The T0 detector consists of two arrays of Cherenkov counters (T0-C and T0-A) positioned at the opposite sides of the interaction point (IP). Each array has 12 cylindrical counters equipped with a quartz radiator and a photomultiplier tube.

ALICE Cosmic Rays Detector (ACORDE)
The ALICE cavern provides an ideal place for the detection of high energy atmospheric muons coming from cosmic ray showers. ACORDE detects cosmic ray showers by triggering the arrival of muons to the top of the ALICE magnet.

The ALICE cosmic ray trigger is made of 60 scintillator modules distributed on the 3 upper faces of the ALICE magnet yoke. The array can be configured to trigger on single or multi-muon events, from 2-fold coincidences up to the whole array if desired. ACORDE's high luminosity allows the recording of cosmic events with very high multiplicity of parallel muon tracks, the so-called muon bundles.

With ACORDE, the ALICE Experiment has been able to detect muon bundles with the highest multiplicity ever registered as well as to indirectly measure very high energy primary cosmic rays .

Data acquisition
ALICE had to design a data acquisition system that operates efficiently in two widely different running modes: the very frequent but small events, with few produced particles encountered during proton-proton collisions and the relatively rare, but extremely large events, with tens of thousands of new particles produced in lead-lead collisions at the LHC (L = 1027 cm−2 s−1 in Pb-Pb with 100 ns bunch crossings and L = 1030-1031 cm−2 s−1 in pp with 25 ns bunch crossings).

The ALICE data acquisition system needs to balance its capacity to record the steady stream of very large events resulting from central collisions, with an ability to select and record rare cross-section processes. These requirements result in an aggregate event building bandwidth of up to 2.5 GByte/s and a storage capability of up to 1.25 GByte/s, giving a total of more than 1 PByte of data every year. As shown in the figure, ALICE needs a data storage capacity that by far exceeds that of the current generation of experiments. This data rate is equivalent to six times the contents of the Encyclopædia Britannica every second.

The hardware of the ALICE DAQ system is largely based on commodity components: PC's running Linux and standard Ethernet switches for the eventbuilding network. The required performances are achieved by the interconnection of hundreds of these PC's into a large DAQ fabric. The software framework of the ALICE DAQ is called DATE (ALICE Data Acquisition and Test Environment). DATE is already in use today, during the construction and testing phase of the experiment, while evolving gradually towards the final production system. Moreover, AFFAIR (A Flexible Fabric and Application Information Recorder) is the performance monitoring software developed by the ALICE Data Acquisition project. AFFAIR is largely based on open source code and is composed of the following components: data gathering, inter-node communication employing DIM, fast and temporary round robin database storage, and permanent storage and plot generation using ROOT.

Finally. the ALICE experiment Mass Storage System (MSS) combines a very high bandwidth (1.25 GByte/s) and every year stores huge amounts of data, more than 1 Pbytes. The mass storage system is made of: a) Global Data Storage (GDS) performing the temporary storage of data at the experimental pit; b) Permanent Data Storage (PDS) for long-term archive of data in the CERN Computing Center and finally from The Mass Storage System software managing the creation, the access and the archive of data.

Results

The physics programme of ALICE includes the following main topics: i) the study of the thermalization of partons in the QGP with focus on the massive charming beauty quarks and understanding the behaviour of these heavy quarks in relation to the strongly coupled medium of QGP, ii) the study of the mechanisms of energy loss that occur in the medium and the dependencies of energy loss on the parton species, iii) the dissociation of quarkonium states which can be a probe of deconfinement and of the temperature of the medium and finally the production of thermal photons and low-mass dileptons emitted by the QGP which is about assessing the initial temperature and degrees of freedom of the systems as well as the chiral nature of the phase transition.

The ALICE collaboration presented its first results from LHC proton collisions at a centre-of-mass energy of 7 TeV in March 2010. The results confirmed that the charged-particle multiplicity is rising with energy faster than expected while the shape of the multiplicity distribution is not reproduced well by standard simulations. The results were based on the analysis of a sample of 300,000 proton–proton collisions the ALICE experiment collected during the first runs of the LHC with stable beams at a centre-of-mass energy, √s, of 7 TeV,

In 2011, the ALICE Collaboration measured the size of the system created in Pb-Pb collisions at a centre-of-mass energy of 2.76 TeV per nucleon pair. ALICE confirmed that the QCD matter created in Pb-Pb collisions behaves like a fluid, with strong collective motions that are well described by hydrodynamic equations. The fireball formed in nuclear collisions at the LHC is hotter, lives longer and expands to a larger size than the medium that was formed in heavy-ion collisions at RHIC. Multiplicity measurements by the ALICE experiment show that the system initially has much higher energy density and is at least 30% hotter than at RHIC, resulting in about double the particle multiplicity for each colliding nucleon pair (Aamodt et al. 2010a).  Further analyses, in particular including the full dependence of these observables on centrality, will provide more insights into the properties of the system – such as initial velocities, the equation of state and the fluid viscosity – and strongly constrain the theoretical modelling of heavy-ion collisions.

A perfect liquid at the LHC
Off-centre nuclear collisions, with a finite impact parameter, create a strongly asymmetric "almond-shaped" fireball. However, experiments cannot measure the spatial dimensions of the interaction (except in special cases, for example in the production of pions, see). Instead, they measure the momentum distributions of the emitted particles. A correlation between the measured azimuthal momentum distribution of particles emitted from the decaying fireball and the initial spatial asymmetry can arise only from multiple interactions between the constituents of the created matter; in other words it tells us about how the matter flows, which is related to its equation of state and its thermodynamic transport properties.

The measured azimuthal distribution of particles in momentum space can be decomposed into Fourier coefficients. The second Fourier coefficient (v2), called elliptic flow, is particularly sensitive to the internal friction or viscosity of the fluid, or more precisely, η/s, the ratio of the shear viscosity (η) to entropy (s) of the system. For a good fluid such as water, the η/s ratio is small. A "thick" liquid, such as honey, has large values of η/s.

In heavy-ion collisions at the LHC, the ALICE collaboration found that the hot matter created in the collision behaves like a fluid with little friction, with η/s close to its lower limit (almost zero viscosity). With these measurements, ALICE has just begun to explore the temperature dependence of η/s and we anticipate many more in-depth flow-related measurements at the LHC that will constrain the hydrodynamic features of the QGP even further.

Measuring the highest temperature on Earth
In August 2012, ALICE scientists announced that their experiments produced quark–gluon plasma with temperature at around 5.5 trillion kelvins, the highest temperature mass achieved in any physical experiments thus far. This temperature is about 38% higher than the previous record of about 4 trillion kelvins, achieved in the 2010 experiments at the Brookhaven National Laboratory.

The ALICE results were announced at the August 13 Quark Matter 2012 conference in Washington, D.C. The quark–gluon plasma produced by these experiments approximates the conditions in the universe that existed microseconds after the Big Bang, before the matter coalesced into atoms.

Energy loss
A basic process in QCD is the energy loss of a fast parton in a medium composed of colour charges. This phenomenon, "jet quenching", is especially useful in the study of the QGP, using the naturally occurring products (jets) of the hard scattering of quarks and gluons from the incoming nuclei. A highly energetic parton (a colour charge) probes the coloured medium rather like an X-ray probes ordinary matter. The production of these partonic probes in hadronic collisions is well understood within perturbative QCD. The theory also shows that a parton traversing the medium will lose a fraction of its energy in emitting many soft (low energy) gluons. The amount of the radiated energy is proportional to the density of the medium and to the square of the path length travelled by the parton in the medium. Theory also predicts that the energy loss depends on the flavour of the parton.

Jet quenching was first observed at RHIC by measuring the yields of hadrons with high transverse momentum. These particles are produced via fragmentation of energetic partons. The yields of these high-pT particles in central nucleus–nucleus collisions were found to be a factor of five lower than expected from the measurements in proton–proton reactions. ALICE has recently published the measurement of charged particles in central heavy-ion collisions at the LHC. As at RHIC, the production of high-pT hadrons at the LHC is strongly suppressed. However, the observations at the LHC show qualitatively new features. The observation from ALICE is consistent with reports from the ATLAS and CMS collaborations on direct evidence for parton energy loss within heavy-ion collisions using fully reconstructed back-to-back jets of particles associated with hard parton scatterings. The latter two experiments have shown a strong energy imbalance between the jet and its recoiling partner (G Aad et al. 2010 and CMS collaboration 2011). This imbalance is thought to arise because one of the jets traversed the hot and dense matter, transferring a substantial fraction of its energy to the medium in a way that is not recovered by the reconstruction of the jets.

Studying quarkonium hadroproduction
Quarkonia are bound states of heavy flavour quarks (charm or bottom) and their antiquarks. Two types of quarkonia have been extensively studied: charmonia, which consist of a charm quark and an anti-charm, and bottomonia made of a bottom and an anti-bottom quark. Charm and anticharm quarks in the presence of the Quark Gluon Plasma, in which there are many free colour charges, are not able to see each other any more and therefore they cannot form bound states. The "melting" of quarkonia into the QGP manifests itself in the suppression of the quarkonium yields compared to the production without the presence of the QGP. The search for quarkonia suppression as a QGP signature started 25 years ago. The first ALICE results for charm hadrons in PbPb collisions at a centre-of-mass energy √sNN = 2.76 TeV indicate strong in-medium energy loss for charm and strange quarks that is an indication of the formation of the hot medium of QGP.

As the temperature increases so does the colour screening resulting in greater suppression of the quarkonium states as it is more difficult for charm – anticharm or bottom – antibottom to form new bound states. At very high temperatures no quarkonium states are expected to survive; they melt in the QGP. Quarkonium sequential suppression is therefore considered as a QGP thermometer, as states with different masses have different sizes and are expected to be screened and dissociated at different temperatures. However - as the collision energy increases - so does the number of charm-anticharm quarks that can form bound states, and a balancing mechanism of recombination of quarkonia may appear as we move to higher energies.

The results from the first ALICE run are rather striking, when compared with the observations from lower energies. While a similar suppression is observed at LHC energies for peripheral collisions, when moving towards more head-on collisions – as quantified by the increasing number of nucleons in the lead nuclei participating in the interaction – the suppression no longer increases. Therefore, despite the higher temperatures attained in the nuclear collisions at the LHC, more J/ψ mesons are detected by the ALICE experiment in Pb–Pb with respect to p–p. Such an effect is likely to be related to a regeneration process occurring at the temperature boundary between the QGP and a hot gas of hadrons.

The suppression of charmonium states was also observed in proton-lead collisions at the LHC, in which Quark Gluon Plasma is not formed. This suggests that the observed suppression in proton-nucleus collisions (pA) is due to cold nuclear matter effects. Grasping the wealth of experimental results requires understanding the medium modification of quarkonia and disentangling hot and cold-matter effects. Today there is a large amount of data available from RHIC and LHC on charmonium and bottomonium suppression and ALICE tries to distinguish between effects due to the formation of the QGP and those from cold nuclear matter effects.

Double-ridge structure in p-Pb collisions

The analysis of the data from the p-Pb collisions at the LHC revealed a completely unexpected double-ridge structure with so far unknown origin. The proton–lead (pPb) collisions in 2013, two years after its heavy-ion collisions opened a new chapter in exploration of the properties of the deconfined, chirally symmetrical state of the QGP. A surprising near-side, long-range (elongated in pseudorapidity) correlation, forming a ridge-like structure observed in high-multiplicity pp collisions, was also found in high-multiplicity pPb collisions, but with a much larger amplitude. However, the biggest surprise came from the observation that this near-side ridge is accompanied by an essentially symmetrical away-side ridge, opposite in azimuth (CERN Courier March 2013 p6). This double ridge was revealed after the short-range correlations arising from jet fragmentation and resonance decays were suppressed by subtracting the correlation distribution measured for low-multiplicity events from the one for high-multiplicity events.

Similar long-range structures in heavy-ion collisions have been attributed to the collective flow of particles emitted from a thermalized system undergoing a collective hydrodynamic expansion. This anisotropy can be characterized by means of the vn (n = 2, 3, ...) coefficients of a Fourier decomposition of the single-particle azimuthal distribution. To test the possible presence of collective phenomena further, the ALICE collaboration has extended the two-particle correlation analysis to identified particles, checking for a potential mass ordering of the v2 harmonic coefficients. Such an ordering in mass was observed in heavy-ion collisions, where it was interpreted to arise from a common radial boost – the so-called radial flow – coupled to the anisotropy in momentum space. Continuing the surprises, a clear particle-mass ordering, similar to the one observed in mid-central PbPb collisions (CERN Courier, September 2013), has been measured in high-multiplicity pPb collisions.

The final surprise, so far, comes from the charmonium states. Whereas J/ψ production does not reveal any unexpected behaviour, the production of the heavier and less-bound (2S) state indicates a strong suppression (0.5–0.7) with respect to J/ψ, when compared with pp collisions. Is this a hint of effects of the medium? Indeed, in heavy-ion collisions, such a suppression has been interpreted as a sequential melting of quarkonia states, depending on their binding energy and the temperature of the QGP created in these collisions.

The first pPb measurement campaign, expected results were widely accompanied by unanticipated observations. Among the expected results is the confirmation that proton–nucleus collisions provide an appropriate tool to study the partonic structure of cold nuclear matter in detail. The surprises have come from the similarity of several observables between pPb and PbPb collisions, which hint at the existence of collective phenomena in pPb collisions with high particle multiplicity and, eventually, the formation of QGP.

Upgrades and future plans

Long Shutdown 1
The main upgrade activity on ALICE during LHC's Long Shutdown 1 was the installation of the dijet calorimeter (DCAL), an extension of the existing EMCAL system that adds 60° of azimuthal acceptance opposite the existing 120° of the EMCAL's acceptance. This new subdetector will be installed on the bottom of the solenoid magnet, which currently houses three modules of the photon spectrometer (PHOS). Moreover, an entirely new rail system and cradle will be installed to support the three PHOS modules and eight DCAL modules, which together weigh more than 100 tones. The installation of five modules of the TRD will follow and so complete this complex detector system, which consists of 18 units,

In addition to these mainstream detector activities, all of the 18 ALICE subdetectors underwent major improvements during LS1 while the computers and discs of the online systems are replaced, followed by upgrades of the operating systems and online software.

All of these efforts are to ensure that ALICE is in good shape for the three-year LHC running period after LS1, when the collaboration looks forward to heavy-ion collisions at the top LHC energy of 5.5 TeV/nucleon at luminosities in excess of 1027 Hz/cm2.

Long shutdown 2 (2018)
The ALICE collaboration has plans for a major upgrade during the next long shutdown, LS2, currently scheduled for 2018. Then the entire silicon tracker will be replaced by a monolithic-pixel tracker system built from ALPIDE chips; the time-projection chamber will be upgraded with gaseous electron-multiplier (GEM) detectors for continuous read-out and the use of new microelectronics; and all of the other subdetectors and the online systems will prepare for a 100-fold increase in the number of events written to tape.

References

External links

Official ALICE Public Webpage  at CERN
Interactive Timeline for ALICE 20th anniversary
ALICE section on US/LHC Website

CERN experiments
Large Hadron Collider